Nothocestrum longifolium, the longleaf aiea, is a species of tree in the nightshade family, Solanaceae, that is 
endemic to Hawaii. It is threatened by habitat loss.

An analysis of the berries revealed them to be one of the most protein-rich of the fruits consumed by nestlings of Corvus hawaiiensis, the Hawaiian crow.

References

Physaleae
Endemic flora of Hawaii
Trees of Hawaii
Biota of Hawaii (island)
Biota of Kauai
Biota of Lanai
Biota of Maui
Biota of Molokai
Biota of Oahu
Near threatened plants
Taxonomy articles created by Polbot